The 1944 Northern Illinois State Huskies football team represented Northern Illinois State Teachers College—now known as Northern Illinois University—as a member of the Illinois Intercollegiate Athletic Conference (IIAC) during the 1944 college football season. Led by 16th-year head coach Chick Evans, the Huskies compiled an overall record of 7–0 with a mark of 3–0 in conference play, winning the IIAC title. The team played home games at the 5,500-seat Glidden Field, located on the east end of campus, in DeKalb, Illinois.

Schedule

References

Northern Illinois State
Northern Illinois Huskies football seasons
Interstate Intercollegiate Athletic Conference football champion seasons
College football undefeated seasons
Northern Illinois State football